DTLA (acronym for Downtown Los Angeles) is a gay-themed television series which premiered October 24, 2012. The series was created, and is co-produced and directed by Larry Kennar. It follows a group of friends in Downtown Los Angeles under the slogan: One City, Seven Lives / Old Friends, New Stories. The main seven characters are Lenny, Bryan, Sara Jane, Matthew, Marky, Kai, Stefan.

Cast
 Darryl Stephens as Leonard "Lenny", a civil litigation attorney and Bryan's boyfriend of six years
 Matthew Stephen Herrick as Bryan, a stoner and Lenny's boyfriend who has been unemployed for over a year
 Marshelle Fair as SJ, a Professor of fashion merchandizing, textiles, and accessories, she is a college friend of Lenny, Kai and Kevin, and estranged wife of Norm
 Hiro Tanaka as Kai Nakamoto, a high school math teacher
 Scott Pretty as Marky, a military man and boyfriend of Matthew
 Patrick McDonald as Matthew Bouvier, Bryan's friend who recently moved to LA to be an actor
 Ernest Pierce as Stefan, a lawyer and friend of Lenny
 JC Jones as Trey, Stefan's young boyfriend, he works in a doughnut shop part-time and has a stage act at night as a drag queen
 Jeremy Jackson as Kevin, a former model, college friend of Lenny, Kai, and SJ, who recently moved back to LA for a new start
 Michael Basilli as Rafi, a manager of a Downtown Los Angeles club, who after meeting Kai soon becomes a romantic interest of Kai
 B. Scott as Bosco, owner of a restaurant they frequently gather at
 Sandra Bernhard as Carla, one of Bryan's mothers
 Melanie Griffith as Kimberley, one of Bryan's mothers
 Paul Mooney as Silas, Lenny's estranged father
 AzMarie Livingston as Ricki, Kimberly's current girlfriend
 William McNamara as Norm, a lawyer and SJ's husband
Ryan Izay as Rod
 Cesar D' La Torre as Ceasar Gomez
 Luenell as Racine, Trey's mother and Ressie's sister
 Tiffany Pollard as Reesie, Trey's aunt and Racine's sister.
 Jeffrey Damnit as Shef, one of Lenny's naked neighbors.

Production
DTLA was originally made as a movie. The U.S.'s two main LGBT cable channels were not enthusiastic about the project; here! passed on the project and Logo was initially non-committal. Brad Danks, COO of OUTtv said, "He called us because he had heard from people in the U.S. that we were doing good things in Canada with the service." After screening a rough cut of the movie for executives of OUTtv they commissioned a series instead. It was originally expected that the series would premiere on OUTtv in the late spring of 2012. On January 25, 2012 Kennar created an account on Kickstarter.com for the series, to secure the remaining required financing via crowd funding. In 6 days 50 people had pledged a total of $4762. On February 21, 2012 it was announced that they had surpassed their target of $25000. In April 2012 it was announced that the premiere of DTLA would be delayed until after the launch of OUTtv's HD channel which would be coming in a few months. In September 2012 it was announced that DTLA had been acquired by Logo. DTLA is the first series funded in part via Kickstarter to receive domestic and international distribution. Distribution outside of Canada and the U.S. is being handled by OUTtv.

Episode list

References

External links
DTLA on imdb.com
DTLA on logotv.com
DTLA on OUTtv.ca
DTLA on Facebook

2012 Canadian television series debuts
2010s American LGBT-related drama television series
English-language television shows
Logo TV original programming
Kickstarter-funded television series
2010s Canadian comedy-drama television series
2010s Canadian LGBT-related drama television series
OutTV (Canadian TV channel) original programming